UNISTREAM, sometimes written UNISTREAM Bank, is an international money transfer company and bank based in Russia.

The service was originally a department of Uniastrum Bank, but in 2006 became a separate company,  with its own banking license.

Unistream has operations at 335,000 locations in over 100 countries.

History 
The Unistream system began functioning as a department of Uniastrum Bank in 2001. The system entered the market, offering tariffs from 1%.

In 2005, the management of Uniastrum Bank made a decision to spin off the system into a separate business. On May 31, 2006, the Central Bank of Russia registered CB Unistream OJSC under No. 3467 and on August 16, 2006, issued a banking license to Unistream CB OJSC.

In November 2006, a 26% stake in the British company Aurora Russia Limited was sold. This deal provided an inflow of $20 million and made the foreign company a co-investor in the business.

The Unistream system is a co-founder of the National Payments Council, founded under the auspices of the Central Bank of the Russian Federation and ARB.

According to the results of 2013, Unistream was named “The Best Money Transfer System in Eastern Europe” by International Finance Magazine. 2012 - laureate of IAMTN (International Association of Money Transfer Systems) and Global Banking & Finance Review Awards.

In February 2015, the Expert RA rating agency confirmed the credit rating of JSC CB Unistream on the national scale at the A + level "Very high level of creditworthiness", the forecast is "stable", the second sublevel, and also assigned a rating on the international scale " BBB- "Moderately high level of long-term creditworthiness", outlook "stable".

At the end of 2015, Unistream launched a service for online transfers from bank cards on its own website.

In October 2016, Ukraine banned operations of Unistream and all other Russian payment systems as part of its sanction policy against the "Russian military intervention in Ukraine".

Since 2016, Unistream has been cooperating with the money transfer network Moneyto Ltd, which acquired the rights to use the Unistream Money Transfer trademark in the European Union.

Shareholders
 GUTRANSFERS GG LIMITED, 100%

Activity 
 The Bank does not operate in the area of highly risky segments, does not operate in the retail lending market.
 International payment system "Unistream" was recognized as the winner in the category "Best Money Transfer System Russia 2015" (The best money transfer system in Russia 2015)
 Unistream is the organizer of the international conference "Bank of the Future", dedicated to payment services, money transfers and innovations.
 Payment system "Unistream" is recognized by the Bank of Russia as nationally significant.
 On May 24, 2017, Expert RA revised the credit rating of JSC CB Unistream due to a change in the methodology and assigned a rating at the level of “ruBBB +” (corresponds to the rating “A + (III)” according to the previously used scale). The rating has a stable outlook.
 Unistream is a member of ARB (Association of Russian Banks), Association “Russia” (Association of Regional Banks of Russia), IAMTN, BACEE, SWIFT.
 In October 2016, the system was included in the Ukraine's sanctions list. Its activity on the territory of Ukraine is prohibited.
 In accordance with the new classification of types of banking licenses of the Bank of Russia, Unistream operates under a universal license, which gives the right to conduct international operations, create branches in a foreign state and provide a wide range of banking services.

Board of directors
Gagik Zakaryan - chairman of the Board of Directors
Georgy Piskov - Member of the Board of Directors
Skvortsov Oleg, Member of the Board of Directors
Sergey Grigoryan, Member of the Board of Directors
Eduard Zamanyan, Member of the Board of Directors

References

External links
 English-language site
 Russian-language site

Financial services companies established in 2006
Banks established in 2006
Banks of Russia
Payment systems
Electronic funds transfer
Companies based in Moscow